Events from the year 1822 in China.

Incumbents
 Daoguang Emperor (2nd year)

Events 
 the teaching and practice of acupuncture and moxibustion were banned from the Imperial Medical Academy (Taiyuyuan)

References 

 
China